This page is a list of 2015 UCI WorldTeams and riders. These teams competed in the 2015 UCI World Tour. Prior to the 2015 season these teams were referred to as UCI ProTeams.

Teams overview

Riders



































Notes

References

See also 

 2015 in men's road cycling
 List of 2015 UCI Professional Continental and Continental teams
 List of 2015 UCI Women's Teams

2015 in men's road cycling
2015